Sumerian Records is an American record label based in Los Angeles, Washington D.C., and London. The label was founded in 2006 by Ash Avildsen. They have signed artists such as Black Veil Brides, Poppy, Bad Omens, Palaye Royale, and The Smashing Pumpkins. It is considered a true lifestyle modern music brand known for both breaking new artists and revitalizing iconic legacy acts. In early 2022, Sumerian acquired Behemoth Entertainment, a comic book and video game publisher, in order to increase their merchandise options and further expand the brand.

History
Founded in 2006 in his Venice Beach apartment, Sumerian Records founder Ash Avildsen first released the records Akeldama by The Faceless and For What It's Worth by Stick to Your Guns in order to let people know the label would be dedicated to underground music but also to diversify the genre's of the label, as the former falls under deathcore while the latter is typically described as Melodic Hardcore. After waiting a year to release another record, in order to ensure third band on their label was "totally doing their own thing independent from everything else going on in the scene", Sumerian released The New Reign by Born of Osiris. Ash later commented on this release in a 2012 interview with Lambgoat by stating "There is something to be said for not putting out too many records each year to where we're able to give focused energy to each band and album rather than always having several releases come out each month". Sumerian has continued to follow this philosophy throughout its near two decade tenure, never surpassing more than thirty artists on the label at one time and typically following a one record a month release schedule.

Since its inauguration, Sumerian has had several seminal artists in the rock, emo, and alternative genres perform on late night television, such as Asking Alexandria, I See Stars, and Crosses(†††) on Jimmy Kimmel, Bones UK on Seth Meyers, and most recently The Smashing Pumpkins on The Tonight Show with Jimmy Fallon.

Current roster 

 After the Burial
 Animals as Leaders
 Bad Omens
 Between the Buried and Me
 Black Veil Brides
 BONES UK
 Born of Osiris
 Dead Posey
 Evan Brewer
 The Faceless
 From First to Last
 I See Stars
 Jonathan Davis
 Juliet Simms AKA Lilith Czar 
 Meg Myers
 The Native Howl
 Night Riots
 Nita Strauss
 Oceano
 OmenXIII
 Palaye Royale
 Slaughter to Prevail
 Sleeping with Sirens
 The Smashing Pumpkins
 Starbenders
 Through Fire
 Thomas Giles
 Veil of Maya
 Weathers (band)

Artists formerly with label

 Asking Alexandria (on Better Noise Music)
 Betraying the Martyrs (on Out of Line Music)
 Bizzy Bone (Active)
 Blackguard (Victory Records)
 Body Count (on Century Media Records)
 Borgore 
 Capture the Crown (name changed to "Capture", inactive)
 CHON (on hiatus)
 Circa Survive (on hiatus)
 Circle of Contempt (Active, Unsigned)
 Conducting From The Grave (Disbanded)
 Crosses (Unsigned)
 Danny Worsnop (on Better Noise Music)
 Darkest Hour (on Southern Lord)
 Dayshell (Active, Independent)
 Dead Letter Circus (on The End Records)
 The Dillinger Escape Plan (Disbanded)
 ERRA (on UNFD)
 Fellsilent (Disbanded)
 I, the Breather (On Pavement Entertainment)
 The Kindred (Disbanded)
 Lower Than Atlantis (Disbanded)
 Make Me Famous (Disbanded)
 Periphery (on 3DOT Recordings)
 Poppy (on Republic Records and Lava Records)
 Sea of Treachery (Active, Unsigned)
 September Mourning
 Soreption (on Unique Leader Records)
 Stick to Your Guns (on Pure Noise Records)
 Stray from the Path (on UNFD)
 Structures (Active, Unsigned)
 Upon a Burning Body (Active, Seek And Strike Records)

Releases

Charts and sales certifications
Sumerian has garnered two RIAA certified gold records for Asking Alexandria's singles “The Final Episode” and “Not The American Average” neither which ever received any mainstream radio play.

In 2014, Sumerian reunited Grammy-winning actor/rapper Ice-T's Body Count and released its highest-selling album in 20+ years, Manslaughter.

In 2020, they released the first true solo album for Jonathan Davis, lead singer of Grammy-winning and timeless influential juggernaut band KoRn. The lead single for Jonathan's album “What It Is” went Top 5 at Rock Radio which was a first for Jonathan outside of KoRn.

Sumerian delivered the highest charting alternative radio song for The Smashing Pumpkins in 12+ years for their lead single “Cyr” off their latest album.

Achievements and awards
In 2010, The Grammy Museum at LA Live had a Golden Gods: History of Heavy Metal Exhibit where the original, band sticker-covered Sony Vaio laptop that founder Ash Avildsen started the label on was displayed as a historical item.

In 2017, Sumerian received its first Grammy nomination for Best Metal Performance for Periphery. That year saw Sumerian also have their first box office theatrical film release in American Satan, which debuted in select AMC theatres across the country and went top 20 in its opening weekend on box office mojo. The movie was picked up by Miramax for distribution and Showtime for first window domestic SVOD in the US and SKY in the UK.

In 2018, Sumerian won the best independent label award at the Metal Hammer Golden Gods in the UK and accepted the award on stage at the O2 in London.

In 2019, they received another “Best Metal Performance”  Grammy nomination for Between The Buried And Me.
In 2019, Guitar World listed two Sumerian artists in the top 4 guitarists of the decade, Tosin Abasi of Animals as Leaders and female solo artist Nita Strauss, who in addition to her solo career and being Alice Cooper’s guitarist, also plays the national anthem for the home games for the LA Rams at Sofi Stadium and for WWE, most recently at WrestleMania 37.

In 2020, the label received its first Best Rock Performance Grammy nomination for Bones UK.

In 2021, Sumerian received the first-ever Grammy nomination in the history of the Recording Academy for a female solo artist in the Best Metal Performance category for Poppy, who also performed at the premiere ceremony.

References

External links
 Official website

 
American independent record labels
Alternative rock record labels
Death metal record labels
Heavy metal record labels
Hardcore record labels
Post-hardcore record labels
Progressive rock record labels